Xishi railway station is a railway station located in Zhutian Township, Pingtung County, Taiwan. It is located on the Pingtung line and is operated by Taiwan Railways.

Around the station
 Pingtung Hakka Cultural Museum

References

1919 establishments in Taiwan
Railway stations opened in 1919
Railway stations in Pingtung County
Railway stations served by Taiwan Railways Administration